Paul-Marie Reynaud (April 12, 1854 – February 26, 1926) was a French Roman Catholic bishop and missionary in China. He was born in the department of Loire. He was a Vincentian. He was Vicar Apostolic of Chekiang (March 7, 1884 – May 10, 1910), Eastern Chekiang (May 10, 1910 – December 3, 1924) and Ningbo (December 3, 1924 – February 23, 1926).

See also

Roman Catholic Diocese of Ningbo

References

1854 births
1926 deaths
Vincentians
French Roman Catholic bishops in Asia
French Roman Catholic missionaries
Roman Catholic missionaries in China
People from Loire (department)
French expatriates in China